The Women's Australian Football League (also known as USAFLW) is a women's Australian rules football competition in the United States of America.
The league is the organising body for women's Australian rules football in the US It operates under the United States Australian Football League USAFL, the sport's governing body in the country.

History
Leigh Swansborough of California began the Women's Australian Football League, organising teams to play in the inaugural women's match in the US. The Orange County Bombshells and an all-comers team played in Kansas City in October 2003. The Bombshells ran out winners by 44 points.

US Nationals
The USAFL National Championships incorporated a Women's Division for the first time in 2005.
The Atlanta Lady Kookaburras won the championship in 2005, 2006 and 2007.  The Canada-based Calgary Kookaburras won the 2008 championship.

National team
The national team, formed to compete against Canada, is known as USA Freedom.

Clubs
Women's teams  include:
Arizona Lady Hawks (Phoenix/Tempe area)
Atlanta Lady Kookaburras Official Site
Denver Lady Bulldogs Official Site
Minnesota Freeze Official Site
North Star Blue Ox Official Site
New York Lady Magpies Official Site
Orange County Bombshells Official Site
San Francisco Iron Maidens Official Site
Seattle Grizzlies 
Washington First Lady Eagles

The game grew rapidly and by 2021 there was a women's club for every men's club, plus two additional teams, the North Star Blue Ox and the Centennial Tigers (a total of 52).

See also

List of Australian rules football women's leagues

References

External links
Official Women's Australian Football Association Website

Women's Australian rules football leagues
Australian football leagues in the United States
Sports leagues established in 2003
2003 establishments in the United States
Aus